The Stony Brook Seawolves women’s basketball team is the college basketball program representing Stony Brook University in Stony Brook, New York. The Seawolves currently participate as part of the NCAA Division I basketball, and compete on the Colonial Athletic Association. The Seawolves currently play their home games in the Island Federal Credit Union Arena.

Stony Brook reached the NCAA tournament for the first time in 2021, a year after the team's 28–3 season ended prematurely with the cancelation of the America East Championship and NCAA Tournament due to the COVID-19 pandemic.

History
Stony Brook began play in the 1969–70 season at the Division III level. The program advanced to Division II beginning in the 1995–96 year, and fully transitioned to Division I in 1999 with Trish Roberts as head coach.

Stony Brook played as a Division I independent for its first two seasons before joining the America East in 2001. In Stony Brook's first season in the America East, the Seawolves finished in seventh place but earned two upsets in the tournament to advance to the finals. Stony Brook almost reached the NCAA Tournament in its first season in the America East but fell to Hartford 50–47.

Roberts failed to reach double-digit victories in her next two seasons and resigned on August 25, 2004 to tend to family issues. Sacramento Monarchs assistant Maura McHugh was named interim head coach on September 10 and promoted to full-time head coach on April 26, 2005 after an 8–20 season.

In McHugh's second season, Stony Brook won 20 games for the first time in program history and finished a program-best second place in the regular season. On December 2, 2005, Stony Brook played No. 19 Temple, its first ranked opponent in program history, and pulled the 58–56 upset. The Seawolves lost in the conference semifinals but qualified for the WNIT, where they lost to Hofstra in the program's first-ever postseason appearance. After another second-place finish in the conference regular season in 2006–07 at 14–2, the Seawolves were upset by UMBC in the quarterfinals and McHugh resigned three months later.

McHugh's assistant Michele Cherry was named her successor, but Cherry suffered three straight 20-loss seasons and was on course for a fourth before she resigned in the middle of the 2010–11 campaign, leading assistant Evelyn Thompson to handle head coaching duties for the remainder of the season.

On April 7, 2011, Canisius associate head coach Beth O'Boyle was named Stony Brook's fourth Division I head coach. O'Boyle posted a dismal 4–26 record in her first season but saw a 10-win improvement the next year and another 10-win improvement the year after. The 2013–14 season saw O'Boyle and the Seawolves break the program record for most single-season Division I wins with 24. Stony Brook returned to the America East Championship for the first time since 2002, but were blown out 70–46 by Albany. Stony Brook qualified for the 2014 WNIT and lost to Michigan 86–48 in Ann Arbor. The Wolverines' head coach was former Stony Brook player Kim Barnes Arico. On April 28, 2014, O'Boyle resigned to accept the head coaching position at VCU.

On June 15, 2014, Auburn assistant head coach Caroline McCombs was named as O'Boyle's successor. In McCombs' first two seasons, Stony Brook finished with 17 wins and in third place in the America East, earning bids to the WBI both times, losing to Siena in 2015 and Youngstown State in 2016. McCombs became the program's all-time winningest head coach on November 21, 2018 with her 67th win, surpassing Roberts. Stony Brook won its first game against a Power Five school by defeating Penn State 81–70 on November 25, 2018. Her first 20-win season came in 2018–19 but ended in the America East semifinals with a loss to Hartford. McCombs reached 100 career victories on January 2, 2020.

The 2019–20 season saw Stony Brook shatter program records, at one point owning a 22-game winning streak, the longest in the nation. Stony Brook defeated Pittsburgh in December for its second program Power Five victory. The Seawolves won their first America East regular season title after defeating Vermont to improve to 25–1 and 13–0 in conference. As the top seed, Stony Brook advanced to the America East Championship with a 28–3 record, set to face Maine at home, but the game was canceled a day before as the COVID-19 pandemic began to sweep through the United States. The Seawolves still earned the America East title as the highest seed remaining.

Stony Brook earned its redemption in the 2020–21 season. The Seawolves, as the second seed in the America East Tournament, earned a bye to the semifinals, routing UMass Lowell to set up a championship rematch with top-seeded Maine. On the road, Stony Brook came back from an 11-point deficit to upset Maine 64–60 and clinch its first trip to the NCAA Tournament in program history. Stony Brook lost 79–44 to Arizona in the first round. McCombs announced on April 2, 2021 that she would be leaving Stony Brook after seven years to be George Washington's new head coach.

On April 28, 2021, James Madison assistant Ashley Langford was hired to replace McCombs.

Postseason

NCAA tournament results
The Seawolves have appeared in the NCAA Division I women's basketball tournament one time. Their overall combined record is 0–1.

WNIT results 
The Seawolves achieved their first Women's National Invitation Tournament (WNIT) appearance in 2006. Their overall combined WNIT record is 0–3.

WBI results 
The Seawolves have appeared in the Women's Basketball Invitational (WBI) two times. Their overall combined WBI record is 0–2.

Season-by-season results

Awards 
America East Coach of the Year

 Caroline McCombs – 2020

America East Player of the Year

 Mykeema Ford – 2007

America East Defensive Player of the Year

 Dana Ferraro – 2006
 Chikilra Goodman – 2014

America East Rookie of the Year

 Jessica Smith – 2004
 Ogechi Anyagaligbo – 2016

America East Sixth Player of the Year

 McKenzie Bushee – 2021

America East All-Conference First Team

 Sherry Jordan – 2002, 2003
 Mykeema Ford – 2006, 2007
 Jessica Smith – 2007
 Chikilra Goodman – 2014
 Sabre Proctor – 2014, 2015
 Shania Johnson – 2018, 2019
 Jerell Matthews – 2019
 India Pagan – 2020

America East All-Conference Defensive Team

 Dana Ferraro – 2006, 2008
 Jessica Smith – 2007
 Kirsten Jeter – 2011
 Chikilra Goodman – 2014
 Jessica Ogunnorin – 2015
 Christina Scognamiglio – 2017
 Cheyenne Clark – 2020
 Hailey Zeise – 2021

References

External links